Joseph Thomas Deal (November 19, 1860 – March 7, 1942) was an American businessman and politician who served four terms as a U.S. Representative from Virginia from 1921 to 1929.

Biography
Born near Surry, Virginia, Deal attended the public schools.
He was graduated from Virginia Military Institute at Lexington in 1882.
He engaged in civil engineering and lumber manufacturing in Surry County, Virginia in 1883.
He moved to Norfolk, Virginia, in 1891.
He served as chairman of the Improvement Board of Norfolk in 1905–1910.
He served as delegate to the Democratic National Convention in 1908.
He served as member of the Virginia House of Delegates during the period 1910–1912.
He served in the Senate of Virginia in 1919.

Congress 
Deal was elected as a Democrat to the Sixty-seventh and to the three succeeding Congresses (March 4, 1921 – March 3, 1929).
He was an unsuccessful candidate for reelection in 1928 to the Seventy-first Congress.

Later career and death 
He resumed his activities in the lumber business until his death in Norfolk, Virginia, on March 7, 1942.
He was interred in Forest Lawn Cemetery.

Elections

1920; Deal was elected to the U.S. House of Representatives defeating Republican Menalcus Lankford and Independent Colin F. Munro, winning 73.59% of the vote.
1922; Deal was re-elected defeating Republicans P.S. Stephenson and W.W. Foreman, winning 86.54% of the vote.
1924; Deal was re-elected defeating Republican Lankford, winning 65.75% of the vote.
1926; Deal was re-elected defeating Republican L.S. Parsons, winning 65.41% of the vote.
1928; Deal was defeated for re-election by Republican Lankford.

Sources

1860 births
1942 deaths
Democratic Party Virginia state senators
Democratic Party members of the Virginia House of Delegates
Democratic Party members of the United States House of Representatives from Virginia
People from Surry County, Virginia
20th-century American politicians